The West Indies cricket team toured Australia, in the Frank Worrell Trophy for a 3-match Test series, a 5-match ODI series, and 2 Twenty20 Internationals from 18 November 2009 to 23 February 2010. Australia remained unbeaten throughout the summer, winning the test series 2–0, ODI series 4–0 and the Twenty20 series 2–0 besides completing a clean sweep of Pakistan earlier in January. Hence the Australians fulfilled their dreams of having an unbeaten summer. Since the introduction of ODIs in the 1970s, they had only one other summer – 2000–01 – when they didn't lose a match.

Squads

Tour matches

First-class match: Queensland v West Indians – 18–21 November

1-day tour match: Prime Minister's XI v West Indians – 4 February

Test series

1st Test

2nd Test

3rd Test

ODI series

1st ODI

2nd ODI

3rd ODI

4th ODI

5th ODI

Twenty20 International Series

1st T20I

2nd T20I

Media coverage
Sky Sports (live) (HD) – United Kingdom and Ireland
Star Cricket (live) – India
Fox Sports (live) (HD) – Australia
SKY Sport (live) (HD) – New Zealand
Geo Super (live) – Pakistan
Supersport (live) – South Africa
Nine Network (live) – Australia
Caribbean Media Corporation (live) – Caribbean countries
Eurosport (live) – Europe
DirecTV (live) – USA

References

2009 in West Indian cricket
2010 in West Indian cricket
2009–10 Australian cricket season
International cricket competitions in 2009–10
2009-10
2009 in Australian cricket
2010 in Australian cricket